The 2018–19 OHL season was the 39th season of the Ontario Hockey League, in which twenty teams played 68 games each according to the regular season schedule, from September 19, 2018 to March 17, 2019. 

The Guelph Storm won the J. Ross Robertson Cup as they defeated the Ottawa 67's in six games to represent the Ontario Hockey League in the 2019 Memorial Cup, which was hosted by the Halifax Mooseheads of the QMJHL at the Scotiabank Centre in Halifax, Nova Scotia from May 17–26, 2019.

Regular season

Final standings
Note: DIV = Division; GP = Games played; W = Wins; L = Losses; OTL = Overtime losses; SL = Shootout losses; GF = Goals for; GA = Goals against; PTS = Points; x = clinched playoff berth; y = clinched division title; z = clinched conference title

Eastern conference

Western conference

Scoring leaders
Note: GP = Games played; G = Goals; A = Assists; Pts = Points; PIM = Penalty minutes

Leading goaltenders
Note: GP = Games played; Mins = Minutes played; W = Wins; L = Losses: OTL = Overtime losses; SL = Shootout losses; GA = Goals Allowed; SO = Shutouts; GAA = Goals against average

Playoffs

Conference quarterfinals

Eastern conference quarterfinals

(1) Ottawa 67's vs. (8) Hamilton Bulldogs

(2) Niagara IceDogs vs. (7) North Bay Battalion

(3) Oshawa Generals vs. (6) Peterborough Petes

(4) Sudbury Wolves vs. (5) Mississauga Steelheads

Western conference quarterfinals

(1) London Knights vs. (8) Windsor Spitfires

(2) Saginaw Spirit vs. (7) Sarnia Sting

(3) Sault Ste. Marie Greyhounds vs. (6) Owen Sound Attack

(4) Guelph Storm vs. (5) Kitchener Rangers

Conference semifinals

Eastern conference semifinals

(1) Ottawa 67's vs. (4) Sudbury Wolves

(2) Niagara IceDogs vs. (3) Oshawa Generals

Western conference semifinals

(1) London Knights vs. (4) Guelph Storm

(2) Saginaw Spirit vs. (3) Sault Ste. Marie Greyhounds

Conference finals

Eastern conference finals

(1) Ottawa 67's vs. (3) Oshawa Generals

Western conference finals

(2) Saginaw Spirit vs. (4) Guelph Storm

OHL Finals

J. Ross Robertson Cup

(E1) Ottawa 67's vs. (W4) Guelph Storm

J. Ross Robertson Cup champions roster

Playoff scoring leaders
Note: GP = Games played; G = Goals; A = Assists; Pts = Points; PIM = Penalty minutes

Playoff leading goaltenders

Note: GP = Games played; Mins = Minutes played; W = Wins; L = Losses: OTL = Overtime losses; SL = Shootout losses; GA = Goals Allowed; SO = Shutouts; GAA = Goals against average

Awards

All-Star teams
The OHL All-Star Teams were selected by the OHL's General Managers.

First team
Morgan Frost, Centre, Sault Ste. Marie Greyhounds
Jason Robertson, Left Wing, Kingston Frontenacs/Niagara IceDogs
Justin Brazeau, Right Wing, North Bay Battalion
Evan Bouchard, Defence, London Knights
Mac Hollowell, Defence, Sault Ste. Marie Greyhounds
Ukko-Pekka Luukkonen, Goaltender, Sudbury Wolves
Andre Tourigny, Coach, Ottawa 67's

Second team
Kevin Hancock, Centre, Owen Sound Attack/London Knights
Arthur Kaliyev, Left Wing, Hamilton Bulldogs
Tye Felhaber, Right Wing, Ottawa 67's
Bode Wilde, Defence, Saginaw Spirit
Adam Boqvist, Defence, London Knights
Kyle Keyser, Goaltender, Oshawa Generals
Cory Stillman, Coach, Sudbury Wolves

Third team
Nick Suzuki, Centre, Owen Sound Attack/Guelph Storm
Isaac Ratcliffe, Left Wing, Guelph Storm
Nate Schnarr, Right Wing, Guelph Storm
Dmitri Samorukov, Defence, Guelph Storm
Thomas Harley, Defence, Mississauga Steelheads
Ivan Prosvetov, Goaltender, Saginaw Spirit
Dale Hunter, Coach, London Knights

2019 OHL Priority Selection
On April 6, 2019, the OHL conducted the 2019 Ontario Hockey League Priority Selection. The Kingston Frontenacs held the first overall pick in the draft, and selected Shane Wright from the Don Mills Flyers of the GTHL. Wright was awarded the Jack Ferguson Award, awarded to the top pick in the draft.

Below are the players who were selected in the first round of the 2019 Ontario Hockey League Priority Selection.

2019 NHL Entry Draft
On June 21-22, 2019, the National Hockey League conducted the 2019 NHL Entry Draft held at Rogers Arena in Vancouver, British Columbia. In total, 25 players from the Ontario Hockey League were selected in the draft. Thomas Harley of the Mississauga Steelheads was the first player from the OHL to be selected, as he was taken with the 18th overall pick by the Dallas Stars.

Below are the players selected from OHL teams at the NHL Entry Draft.

2019 CHL Import Draft
On June 27, 2019, the Canadian Hockey League conducted the 2019 CHL Import Draft, in which teams in all three CHL leagues participate in. The Kingston Frontenacs held the first pick in the draft by a team in the OHL, and selected Martin Chromiak from Slovakia with their selection.

Below are the players who were selected in the first round by Ontario Hockey League teams in the 2019 CHL Import Draft.

References

External links
 www.ontariohockeyleague.com

Ontario Hockey League seasons
Ohl